Irakli Zoidze (born 21 March 1969) is a Georgian footballer.

Football career
Zoidze has played for clubs in Georgia, Israel and Lithuania. He often compete with Davit Gvaramadze during his career at Dinamo Tbilisi and Torpedo Kutaisi.

International career
Zoidze played for Georgia since 8 February 1994. He played once at UEFA Euro 1996 qualifying before lost first choice place to Akaki Devadze. He then played the last two matches in the qualifying after Georgia certainly finished 2nd or below in the 8th round, and have to complete with Germany. He is the regular starter at 1998 FIFA World Cup qualification (UEFA), but the last three games was given to Nikoloz Togonidze. He returned to the national team in 2001, played once in friendly and two in 2002 FIFA World Cup qualification (UEFA).

External links

1969 births
Living people
Footballers from Georgia (country)
Georgia (country) international footballers
FC Torpedo Kutaisi players
FC Dinamo Tbilisi players
Maccabi Jaffa F.C. players
FBK Kaunas footballers
Liga Leumit players
Expatriate footballers from Georgia (country)
Expatriate footballers in Israel
Expatriate footballers in Lithuania
Expatriate sportspeople from Georgia (country) in Israel
Expatriate sportspeople from Georgia (country) in Lithuania
Association football goalkeepers